Einar Jan Aas (born 12 October 1955) is a Norwegian former footballer who played as a central defender. He was the first Norwegian to play professionally in England and Germany.

Club career
Aas started his career in Moss FK in 1973. In 1976, they were promoted to the Norwegian Premier League, and Verdens Gang named him central defender of the year in 1977 and 1979.

His professional career started at Bayern Munich, where he stayed for the 1979–80 season. Midway through the following season, he was transferred to Nottingham Forest, at the time managed by Brian Clough. A broken leg put a premature end to his stay at the City Ground. He returned to Moss in 1984, and helped the club win its first and to date only League title in 1987, before retiring as a player.

International career
Aas debuted in the national team in 1978, and played 35 international matches in total, scoring three goals.

Personal
He has his education from the Norwegian School of Sport Sciences.

References

External links
 

1955 births
Living people
People from Moss, Norway
Expatriate footballers in England
Expatriate footballers in Germany
FC Bayern Munich footballers
Bundesliga players
Association football defenders
Moss FK players
Norway international footballers
Norwegian expatriate footballers
Norwegian expatriate sportspeople in Germany
Norwegian expatriate sportspeople in England
Norwegian footballers
Nottingham Forest F.C. players
English Football League players
Norwegian School of Sport Sciences alumni
Sportspeople from Viken (county)